Lesina is a town and comune, former bishopric and Latin Catholic titular see on the northern side of Monte Gargano in the province of Foggia, in the Apulia region of southeast Italy.

Description 

Lesina lies on the northern side of Gargano and on the shores of the lake with the same name. It is a maritime village known for the production of (female) eels. The site, populated since the Neolithic era, is a narrow strip of land covered with sandy dunes and little woods, separating the lake from the sea, which creeps into its waters through two canals (Aquarotta and Schiapparo).

Lesina, built after the immigration of Dalmatian fishers, and known to Romans as Alexina, was often afflicted by earthquakes and sea flooding, and its population was decimated by malaria.

The hot waters of Caldoli stream, not very far and near San Nazario Sanctuary, testify to its volcanic activities. The first patron saint of the town is San Primiano Martire, celebrated on 15 May.

Main sights 
 Lesina Cathedral
 Episcopal Palace (13th century)
 Natural Museum of the Lake Lesina

References

External links 
 Official website

Cities and towns in Apulia
Catholic titular sees in Europe